Bruno Carette (1956–1989) was a French humorist and comedian. He was a member and founder of the group of comedians Les Nuls alongside Alain Chabat, Chantal Lauby and Dominique Farrugia.

Filmography
 1988 : Sans peur et sans reproche directed by Gérard Jugnot
 1990 : May Fools directed by Louis Malle
 1994 : La cité de la peur directed by Alain Berbérian (archive footage)

1956 births
1989 deaths
French humorists
People from Algiers
French male writers
20th-century French male writers